Giant Food may refer to:

 Giant Food (Landover),  also known as Giant Food of Maryland, LLC, a division of Ahold Delhaize
 Giant Food Stores, also known as The Giant Company, a division of Ahold Delhaize

See also
 Food Giant (disambiguation)
 Giant Hypermarket
 Giant Markets, a former grocery store chain that was acquired by Weis Markets in August 2009
 Giant Open Air, a former grocery chain